Tentaspina duospina is a moth of the family Erebidae first described by Michael Fibiger in 2011. It is found on the Philippines (it was described from Leyte Island).

The wingspan is about 11 mm. The head, outer surface of the labial palps, basal part of the thorax, basal part of the patagia and basal part of the tegulae are light brown The forewings are whitish beige and the costa is black basally, just like the quadrangular upper, medial and terminal areas including the fringes. The crosslines including the medial shade are light brown and waved. The terminal line is only indicated by black interveinal dots. The hindwings are dark grey. The underside of the forewings is unicolorous brown and the underside of the hindwings is grey with a discal spot.

References

Micronoctuini
Moths described in 2011
Taxa named by Michael Fibiger